Rosa María Britton (28 July 1936, Panama City – 16 July 2019, Panama City) was a Panamanian doctor and novelist.

Background and education
Her father was Cuban and her mother was Panamanian. She attended school in Panama City and her secondary studies in Havana, Cuba. She studied medicine at the University of Madrid in Spain and continued her studies in gynecology and oncology at the Brooklyn Jewish Medical Center in the United States.

She lived in Panama since 1973.

Works

Novels
El ataúd de uso, 1983
El señor de las lluvias y el viento, 1984
No pertenezco a este siglo, 1991
Todas íbamos a ser Reinas, 1997
Laberintos de orgullo, 2002
Suspiros de fantasmas, 2005

Tales
 ¿Quién inventó el mambo? , 1985, Panama.
 La muerte tiene dos caras, 1987, Costa Rica.
 Semana de la mujer y otras calamidades, 1995, Spain.
 La nariz invisible y otros misterios, 2001, Spain.
 Historia de Mujeres Crueles, Editorial Alfaguara, 2011, Spain.

Theater
Esa Esquina del Paraiso, 1986
Banquete de despedida/Miss Panamá Inc., 1987

References

External links
  Website

1936 births
2019 deaths
Panamanian women writers
Panamanian short story writers
Panamanian novelists
Panamanian obstetricians and gynaecologists
Panamanian women short story writers
Panamanian women novelists
Panamanian people of Cuban descent
People from Panama City
Women dramatists and playwrights
20th-century novelists
20th-century dramatists and playwrights
20th-century short story writers
20th-century Panamanian women writers
20th-century Panamanian writers
21st-century Panamanian women writers
21st-century Panamanian writers